Steven Keats (born Steven Paul Keitz; February 6, 1945 – May 8, 1994) was an American actor who appeared in such films as Death Wish (as Charles Bronson's character's son-in-law), Black Sunday and the Chuck Norris thriller Silent Rage.

Early life and education
Keats was born in the Bronx to Francis (née Rebold) and Daniel David Keitz. His father was born in Copenhagen, Denmark to Polish Jewish parents from Warsaw. His mother was born in New York, also to a Polish Jewish family. As a small child his father was the proprietor of a camera store and the family lived on Bryant Avenue in the South Bronx.

He grew up in Canarsie, Brooklyn, New York. At the time of his graduation from Thomas Jefferson High School in 1962 he was living in Bay View Houses, a public housing project.  After serving a tour of duty in Vietnam with the United States Air Force from 1965 to 1966, Keats attended the Yale School of Drama in 1969–1970. He is the father of photographer and actor Thatcher Keats and of Shane Keats.

Career
Keats debuted on Broadway in the second cast of Oh! Calcutta! and appeared in over 80 films and TV shows. He was nominated for an Emmy in 1977 for his role as the ruthless, Great Depression-era entrepreneur Jay Blackman, who clawed his way to the top of the "rag trade", or clothing business, in the 1977 miniseries Seventh Avenue. He also portrayed Thomas Edison on the brink of inventing the electric light bulb in the science fiction TV series Voyagers!.

His film career included roles in The Friends of Eddie Coyle (1973), Death Wish (1974), The Gambler (1974), The Gumball Rally (1976), The Last Dinosaur (1977), Black Sunday (1977), The Ivory Ape (1980), Hangar 18 (1980), Silent Rage (1982), Turk 182 (1985), Badge of the Assassin (1985), and the 1982 TV movie of the Norman Mailer book The Executioner's Song.

Keats appeared in the 1975 film Hester Street. Set on New York City's Lower East Side of the 1890s, Keats played Jake Podkovnik (late of Russia), an assimilated "Amerikaner". He played a deranged bomber in the 1974 Kojak episode "Therapy in Dynamite", and guest-starred on an episode of The A-Team, "Harder Than It Looks". He played Ed McClain on Another World and guest-starred as Alf Gresham on All My Children. In 1983 he appeared in the first episode of Automan as Collins. In 1987, in the final season of Hill Street Blues, he played detective Penzickis.  He also played TV reporter Jake Baron on the April 6, 1990 episode of MacGyver, titled "Rush to Judgement".

Death
On May 8, 1994, Keats was found dead in his apartment in Manhattan. His son said that he committed suicide.

Filmography

References

External links

Obituary, nytimes.com

1945 births
1994 deaths
American male film actors
American male television actors
United States Air Force personnel of the Vietnam War
Yale University alumni
Male actors from New York City
People from Canarsie, Brooklyn
20th-century American male actors
People from the Bronx
American people of Polish-Jewish descent
American people of Danish-Jewish descent
Jewish American male actors
Fiorello H. LaGuardia High School alumni
United States Air Force airmen
20th-century American Jews